Pamidronic acid or pamidronate disodium or APD (marketed as Aredia among others), is a nitrogen-containing bisphosphonate used to prevent osteoporosis.

It was patented in 1971 and approved for medical use in 1987.

Medical uses
It is used to prevent bone loss, and treat osteoporosis.  It is also used to strengthen bone in Paget's disease, to prevent bone loss due to steroid use, and in certain cancers with high propensity to bone, such as multiple myeloma. Due to its ability to sequester calcium in bone, it is also used to treat high calcium levels.
It is also used as an experimental treatment of the bone disorder osteogenesis imperfecta.  It has been studied in the treatment of complex regional pain syndrome.

Administration
Intravenous, usually 90 mg monthly.  30 mg, 60 mg, 90 mg and for hospitals, 120 mg vials are available, mixed with mannitol.

Side effects
Common side effects include bone pain, low calcium levels, nausea, and dizziness.
Osteonecrosis of the jaw is a rare complication which has been associated with the use of bisphosphonates, including pamidronate.

Pamidronate activates human γδ T cells in vitro and in vivo, which may lead to flu-like symptoms upon administration.

Pharmacology

References

Bisphosphonates
Farnesyl pyrophosphate synthase inhibitors
Nephrotoxins